The Federal Vision (also called Auburn Avenue Theology) is a Reformed evangelical theological conversation that focuses on covenant theology, Trinitarian thinking, the sacraments of baptism and communion, biblical theology and typology, justification, and postmillennialism. A controversy arose in Reformed and Presbyterian circles in response to views expressed at a 2002 conference entitled The Federal Vision: An Examination of Reformed Covenantalism. The ongoing controversy involves several Reformed denominations including the Orthodox Presbyterian Church (OPC), the Presbyterian Church in America (PCA), the United Reformed Churches in North America (URCNA), and the Reformed Presbyterian Church in the United States (RPCUS), and the Protestant Reformed Churches in America (PRCA).

Influences 
Proponents of Federal Vision theology view themselves as influenced by the Protestant Reformers, especially those responsible for drawing up the Westminster Confession.

They argue that the influences of their theology are not limited to the work of pre-Great Awakening writers, however. They find precedent for their beliefs through the Awakenings and up to the present day.

History and controversy 
In January 2002 Auburn Avenue Presbyterian Church (PCA) in Monroe, Louisiana (now Church of the Redeemer, West Monroe, Louisiana), hosted its annual pastors' conference with speakers  Douglas Wilson, John Barach, Steve Wilkins, and Steve Schlissel addressing the topic "The Federal Vision: An Examination of Reformed Covenantalism." The organizers and speakers intended the conference to provide a positive covenantal (i.e., federal) view (i.e., vision) of issues such as assurance of salvation and child-rearing. In June 2002, the RPCUS, a small Presbyterian denomination, issued a public call for repentance by the four speakers, charging them with "a fundamental denial of the essence of the Christian Gospel in the denial of justification by faith alone" and with "introducing false  hermeneutic principles; the infusion of sacerdotalism; and the redefinition of [certain] doctrines..."  As a result of this response and further debate and discussion regarding the conference teaching, the theological views presented at the conference came to be known as Federal Vision theology or Auburn Avenue theology.

In addition to the original four conference speakers, a number of men have identified themselves as proponents of Federal Vision theology by signing a document entitled "A Joint Federal Vision Profession."  Signers include Randy Booth, Tim Gallant, Mark Horne, James B. Jordan, Peter Leithart, Rich Lusk, and Ralph A. Smith.  A number of these men have particular areas of theological interest. For instance, Gallant writes mostly on paedocommunion, and Smith on the Trinity. As of 2017, Douglas Wilson no longer identifies with the Federal Vision label, though he stated that the change "...does not represent any substantial shift or sea change in the content of what I believe."

Those who oppose Federal Vision theology include E. Calvin Beisner, R. Scott Clark, Ligon Duncan, David Engelsma, J. V. Fesko,  Michael Horton, Joseph Pipa, John Robbins, Brian Schwertley, Morton H. Smith,  David Van Drunen and Guy Waters.

Ecclesiastical responses
In addition to the RPCUS’s 2002 response, several other Reformed and Presbyterian denominations have ruled on the orthodoxy of Federal Vision or are currently in the process of doing so:
 In 2006, The Orthodox Presbyterian Church's "Report on Justification" did "not condemn all of the views of those mentioned herein [but] does agree that aberrant views on justification have been promulgated from within these circles," and it reaffirmed its commitment to the traditional understanding of the doctrine of justification and offered a critique of the Federal Vision.
 In 2007, the Presbyterian Church in America (PCA) appointed a study committee to examine the issue, and that committee produced a report which "is to be given due and serious consideration by the church and its courts" concluding that the teachings of Federal Vision on election, justification, and other doctrines are contrary to the Westminster Standards, the PCA’s doctrinal standards.
 In June 2009, the Reformed Church in the United States rejected Federal Vision theology as not being in accordance with its doctrinal standards.
 At the 2010 Synod, the URCNA passed a 60-page report condemning Federal Vision as heresy.

In reply to these denominational criticisms, several Federal Vision proponents developed and signed a "Joint Federal Vision Profession," which briefly outlines what they affirm and what they deny in each of the controverted areas.  Auburn Avenue Presbyterian Church, the church at which the original 2002 conference was held, has revised and republished its statement on "Covenant, Baptism, and Salvation," which they state was "not intended to erect some new standard of orthodoxy or to imply that we were settled on these points and could not be challenged or dissuaded from them, and it was certainly not intended to erect another wall to divide the Church or as a means to denounce or exclude from fellowship our brothers who might disagree with us," and that it was "a response to the critique and instruction we have received and is an effort to make our position more clear and (we trust) more easily understood.  We continue to study and learn and continue to be open to further correction and instruction."

General beliefs 

The leading proponents of Federal Vision theology are  Reformed, and consider their understanding of these issues to be, with some exceptions, in keeping with the major Reformed confessions: the Three Forms of Unity and the Westminster Confession of Faith. The following subsections outline the distinctives and particular emphases of the Federal Vision as outlined in the "Joint Federal Vision Statement".

Trinity 
Proponents of the Federal Vision believe the  trinitarian relationships among the Godhead to be the model for all covenantal relationships and the foundation for understanding the Bible. Following Van Til and Rushdoony, they claim that the Trinity is the only acceptable solution to the philosophical "one and many problem."  Their Trinitarian theology influences all areas of their theology, particularly their view of the covenant.

Postmillennial eschatology 
Advocates of the Federal Vision believe that Christ will not physically return to Earth until the Earth is as "full of the knowledge of the Lord as the waters cover the sea" (Habakkuk 2:14), which postmillennialists believe refers to the conversion of the majority of the world to Christ. While this is consistent with postmillennial doctrine, not all Federal Visionists are postmillennial.

Covenant objectivity 

The central distinctive of the Federal Vision is its view of the  covenant. In keeping with the historic Reformed understanding of Covenant Theology, Federal Vision proponents argue that God has had two  covenants with humanity throughout history: the first pre-Fall and the second post-Fall. The second covenant was progressively expanded throughout the Old Testament in various advanced covenants (Noahic, Abrahamic, Mosaic and Davidic), and reached its climax with Jesus and the New Covenant.

What distinguishes the Federal Vision from other interpretations of Covenant Theology is its view of the nature of the covenant, namely that the covenant is "objective" and that all covenant members are part of God’s family whether or not they are decretally elect.

It is an admixture of covenant objectivity and God's predestinating power in election that has resulted in the Federal Vision position on the covenant. Because Federal Vision leaders believe the Old Testament argued for corporate election of all Israel, so too does the New Testament for all who are in the Church. This results in a distinction in election – there are the decreed elect (that precise number God intends to save and who will persevere in their faith) and the covenantally elect (those who are predestined to be a follower of Christ for a time, but are not predestined to persevere in their faith and who will eventually fall away). Consider Lusk's comment:

He goes on to speak of apostates within the covenant:

Proponents of the Federal Vision claim to reflect the authentic views of John Calvin on election and covenantal objectivity, citing Calvin's distinction between common election and special election: "Although the common election is not effectual in all, yet may it set open a gate for the special elect." Calvin wrote concerning effectual calling,

Advocates of the Federal Vision believe that in the covenant, God promises certain blessings for faithful living, and promises curses for unfaithful living (based on Deuteronomy 28), which makes the covenant objective. Once a person has entered the covenant through baptism, he cannot escape its consequences. If, through unbelief, he lives a life unfaithful to the covenant or abandons it, he will be subject to God's curses and displeasure.

Baptism 
Proponents of the Federal Vision have a view of baptism that they argue returns to the beliefs of the original Reformers, particularly John Calvin. This baptismal view is different from both Roman Catholic and contemporary Protestant beliefs on baptism. Douglas Wilson writes:

To them, baptism is the entrance into both the covenant and the  church. As a result of the covenantal union between the act of baptism and the work of the Holy Spirit, Federal Vision advocates affirm a form of baptismal regeneration that they argue is a return to Calvin's thought and the teachings of the historically Reformed.

This point has generated much controversy and confusion, because the advocates of the Federal Vision do not mean  regeneration as the term is used today. Rather, they claim to employ the original sense of the word as used by the reformers. Louis Berkhof writes, "Calvin also used the term [regeneration] in a very comprehensive sense as a designation of the whole process by which man is renewed." Critics point out, however, that all the benefits of saving union with Christ are associated with baptism by Federal Vision writers. Critics believe that this teaching more closely aligns them with Lutheran views of baptism.

Using this definition of regeneration, the Federal Vision position is that physical and spiritual baptism should be seen as a unity normally. Rich Lusk writes,

In his concluding analysis of the Federal Vision baptismal theology, Joseph Minich (who claims not to be an FV advocate) writes, "Baptism is not a 'work' performed, after which one can have full assurance. It is not another 'instrument' of justification alongside faith. Rather, it is a visible act of God (especially apparent in the case of infants) that is to be seen as the locus of Christian certainty. It is the place where God promises to meet His own.  To look to baptism for assurance is not to look for salvation in 'water,' but to cling to the place where God promises to meet His people and bless them."

Those associated with the Federal Vision often include under the name "Christian" all who have been baptized in the name of the Triune God.

Communion 
The Federal Vision emphasizes the blessings that come from partaking in communion as the nourishing feast of the covenant. While denying both mere symbolism and the presence of Christ in the elements themselves, they believe that Christ's presence with the church in the sacrament has sanctifying effects.

Advocates of the Federal Vision are proponents of paedocommunion, the indiscriminate distribution  of the communion to all infants and children of church members. They argue that accepting infants and small children to the Table was the classic Christian position until the 14th century, and that all covenant members, including infants, should be admitted to the table unless they are under formal church discipline.

Paedocommunion is not an exclusively Federal Vision position. Non–Federal Vision Reformed advocates of paedocommunion include C. John Collins, Curtis Crenshaw, Gary North and  Andrew Sandlin. Non-Reformed Evangelical supporters include William Willimon and N. T. Wright.

Opponents of paedocommunion argue that the practice is not in keeping with classical Calvinist theology, noting that traditional Reformed teaching and practice requires a communicant to be capable of self-examination, according to St. Paul's teaching in 1 Corinthians 11.

Calvin specifically rejects paedocommunion in his Institutes of the Christian Religion Book IV, chapter xvi, section 30.

Biblical theology and typology 
One of the foundational distinctives of the Federal Vision movement is the method which they use to interpret the Bible. Rather than treating Bible interpretation as a science or a method, they consider it much more of an intuitive art. Rich Lusk says,

Biblical theology methods of interpretation do not treat the Bible as a collection of facts and doctrines as systematic theology does. Rather, it treats the Bible as a great story of God's redemptive and transformative purposes in the world for the world. Thus, interpreting the Bible through the  typological system means emphasizing literary analysis and the flow of the overarching Story through each of the smaller, individual stories.

This method of interpretation has been around since the Church Fathers, and writers such as Geerhardus Vos and other 19th century Presbyterian theologians have contributed to the present Presbyterian understanding. In 19th century German Protestantism, typological interpretation was distinguished from rectilinear interpretation of prophecy. The former was associated with Hegelian theologians and the latter with Kantian analyticity. In the 20th century, typological interpretation was fleshed out by David Chilton and Meredith G. Kline, but especially by theologian James B. Jordan, whose books on typology (such as Through New Eyes), and the commentaries of Peter Leithart serve as the interpretive foundations for the Federal Vision theology.

Adherents of the Federal Vision often make use of and recommend the general interpretive works of Sidney Greidanus, Christopher J. H. Wright, Richard Gaffin, N. T. Wright, Stanley Hauerwas, George Stroup,  Richard Hays, Rikk Watts, Willard Swartley, Sylvia Keesmaat, Ben Witherington, J Ross Wagner, Don Garlington, Craig Evans, Steve Moyise, and David Pao.

Typological hermeneutics are not mentioned explicitly in the "Joint Federal Vision Statement".

Imputation 
Another controversial aspect of the Federal Vision theology is the denial of the  imputation of Christ’s active obedience in His earthly life. Theologians involved with the Federal Vision are not agreed on the denial of imputation. James Jordan has denied that any part of Christ’s earthly works are imparted to believers. Norman Shepherd is in agreement with him.  Peter Leithart has publicly said in a letter to PCA Pacific Northwest Presbytery that

Rich Lusk’s position seems to be the closest to a representative position for the Federal Vision theologians as a whole. First, he does not deny Christ’s active obedience:

Similarly, James Jordan writes "that there is a double imputation of our sins to Jesus and His glory to us is certainly beyond question, and I am not disagreeing with the general doctrine of imputation, or of double imputation."

What the Federal Vision proponents do question is whether Christ's earthly works do us any good. Jordan  says:

Lusk agrees:

Rather, the Federal Vision theologians see believers as being in "union with Christ," as partaking of Christ's resurrection and glorified Life, rather than believers getting righteousness credit given to them.  Lusk again:

Lusk compares this "union with Christ" with the analogy:Suppose a woman is in deep, deep debt and has no means at her disposal to pay it off. Along comes an ultra wealthy prince charming. Out of grace and love, he decides to marry her. He covers her debt. But then he has a choice to make about how he will care for his bride. After canceling out her debt, will he fill up her account with his money? That is to say, will he transfer or impute his own funds into an account that bears her name? Or will he simply make his own account a joint account so it belongs to both of them? In the former scenario, there is an imputation, a transfer. In the second scenario, the same final result is attained, but there is no imputation, strictly speaking. Rather, there is a real union, a marriage. Both Andrew Sandlin and Norman Shepherd agree that union with Christ's resurrection life, rather than the imputation of Christ's earthly obedient works, is how sinners are justified before God.

Despite internal disagreement on the matter, Federal Vision theologians are agreed that

Federal Vision and the New Perspectives on Paul 
Some critics of Federal Vision theology have connected it with the New Perspective on Paul. Federal Vision proponents have sought to maintain a distinction between the two theologies while acknowledging that they do have some general ideas in common. Yet many critics of the Federal Vision still group the two movements together. Outspoken critic Guy Waters notes,

Proponent James B. Jordan says similarly,

Douglas Wilson has noted six foundational tenets of the NPP. He affirms the correctness of points 1–3.
 Justification by faith was present in the Old Testament as well as the New Testament.
 Faith and works are not opposed to one another in the Bible. Faith was always present, even in the Old Testament. The Jews were not trying to earn anything by works.
 Law and grace are not opposed to one another, or that the Old Testament was mostly law and the New Testament was mostly grace.
 Paul's primary focus was not individual salvation, but corporate salvation.
 Judaism was not a religion based on salvation by works or merit.
 Judaism satisfied Paul's burden of guilt; rather than what the Old Perspective thought, that Judaism could not ease Paul's conscience.

Most of the Federal Vision proponents have publicly said they appreciate much of what NT Wright has written. Both Mark Horne and Rich Lusk have defended Wright against his Reformed critics.  Horne has said that the NPP "is not a rejection of the Reformed doctrine."  Lusk has said virtually the same thing, saying that Wright "is a true sola scriptura Protestant."  Douglas Wilson has called Wright a "Christian gentleman" who "has a lot to contribute," and has commended Wright's insistence that Paul is a "thorough-going covenant theologian," but has also leveled criticism at Wright:

Peter Leithart, Steve Wilkins and Steve Schlissel share similarities theologically with the NPP, though they have not publicly said they have consciously shaped their theology after Wright's. Leithart, however, has said that Federal Vision theology "is stimulated by Anglican New Testament scholar NT Wright..."

References

Further reading

Pro
 .
 .
 .
 .
 .
 .
 .
 .
 .
 .
 .
 .
 .
 .
 .
 .
 .
 .
 .
 .

Con
 .
 .
 .
 .
 .
 .
  Roberts, Dewey,  Historic Christianity and the Federal Vision: A Theological Analysis and Practical Evaluation, Sola Fide Publications, 2016, .

External links

General information
 A Joint Federal Vision Statement — A series of affirmations and denials on key Federal Vision doctrines cosigned by leading proponents

Information related to particular church bodies
 Report on Justification Presented to the Seventy-third General Assembly of the Orthodox Presbyterian Church — Includes a doctrinal response to the New Perspective
 Report of Ad Interim Study Committee on Federal Vision, New Perspective, and Auburn Avenue Theologies — Presented at the 35th General Assembly of the PCA
 Regarding the 2002 Auburn Avenue Pastors Conference — Resources on the controversy from the RPCUS
 Mississippi Valley Presbytery Report — PCA Ad Hoc Committee Report on the NPP/Auburn Avenue Theology/Federal Vision, 2005
 Submitted Written Questions for Louisiana Presbytery's Examination of Teaching Elder Steve Wilkins — Submitted on December 9, 2006

Calvinist theology
Protestantism-related controversies
Christian theological movements
2002 in Louisiana